The theta nigrum ("black theta") or theta infelix ("unlucky theta") is a symbol of death in Greek and Latin epigraphy. Isidore of Seville notes the letter was appended after the name of a deceased soldier and finds of papyri containing military records have confirmed this use. Additionally it can be seen in the Gladiator Mosaic.

The term theta nigrum was coined by Theodor Mommsen. It consists of a circle with a diagonal line. The Theta signified Thanatos, the Greek deity of death.

See also 
 "ꝋ" for "obiit" (="died")

References

Cultural aspects of death
Symbols
Epigraphy
Greek letters